UT men's basketball may refer to:

 Tampa Spartans men's basketball, the collegiate men's basketball program of The University of Tampa
 Tennessee Volunteers basketball, the collegiate men's basketball program of the University of Tennessee, Knoxville
 Texas Longhorns men's basketball, the collegiate men's basketball program of The University of Texas at Austin
 Toledo Rockets men's basketball, the collegiate men's basketball program of The University of Toledo